Tuai  is a village and rural community located around Lake Whakamarino, in the Wairoa District of the Hawke's Bay Region, on New Zealand's North Island.

The local Tuai Power Station was opened in 1929 on the shores of Lake Whakamarino, as part of the Waikaremoana power scheme. Genesis Energy has controlled the power station remotely from Tokaanu power station since the early 2000s.

Artist Doris Lusk depicted the power station in a 1948 painting. She described the power station as a “gothic building in the middle of the wild hills”.

Lake Whakamarino, also known as Tuai Lake, is popular with anglers. It can be used by fly-fishers, and accessed with small unanchored boats.

Demographics
It is part of the wider Maungataniwha-Raupunga statistical area.

Tuai had a population of 216 at the 2018 New Zealand census, an increase of 3 people (1.4%) since the 2013 census, and a decrease of 27 people (−11.1%) since the 2006 census. There were 78 households, comprising 105 males and 111 females, giving a sex ratio of 0.95 males per female. The median age was 31.2 years (compared with 37.4 years nationally), with 57 people (26.4%) aged under 15 years, 45 (20.8%) aged 15 to 29, 84 (38.9%) aged 30 to 64, and 27 (12.5%) aged 65 or older.

Ethnicities were 26.4% European/Pākehā, 84.7% Māori, and 2.8% Pacific peoples. People may identify with more than one ethnicity.

Although some people chose not to answer the census's question about religious affiliation, 38.9% had no religion, 25.0% were Christian, 26.4% had Māori religious beliefs and 1.4% had other religions.

Of those at least 15 years old, 18 (11.3%) people had a bachelor's or higher degree, and 36 (22.6%) people had no formal qualifications. The median income was $22,100, compared with $31,800 nationally. 12 people (7.5%) earned over $70,000 compared to 17.2% nationally. The employment status of those at least 15 was that 66 (41.5%) people were employed full-time, 21 (13.2%) were part-time, and 15 (9.4%) were unemployed.

Marae

Te Kūhā Tārewa Marae and Te Poho o Hinekura or Ruapani meeting house is a meeting place of the Tūhoe hapū of Ngāti Hinekura, and the Ngāti Ruapani hapū of Ngati Hinekura and Tuwai.

In October 2020, the Government committed $1,949,075 from the Provincial Growth Fund to upgrade the marae and 23 other Ngāti Kahungunu marae. The funding was expected to create 164 jobs.

Education

Te Kura o Waikaremoana is a Year 1–8 co-educational state primary school.

References

Wairoa District
Populated places in the Hawke's Bay Region